Lower Egypt is the northernmost region of Egypt, which consists of the fertile Nile Delta between Upper Egypt and the Mediterranean Sea, from El Aiyat, south of modern-day Cairo, and Dahshur. Historically, the Nile River split into seven branches of the delta in Lower Egypt. 

Lower Egypt was divided into nomes and began to advance as a civilization after 3600 BC. Today, it contains two major channels that flow through the delta of the Nile River – Mahmoudiyah Canal (ancient Agathos Daimon) and Muways Canal ("waterway of Moses").

Name 
In Ancient Egyptian, Lower Egypt was known as mḥw which means "north". Later on, during Antiquity and the Middle Ages, Greeks and Romans called it Κάτω Αἴγυπτος or Aegyptus Inferior both meaning "Lower Egypt", but Copts carried on using the old name related to the north – Tsakhet or Psanemhit meaning the "Northern part". It was further divided into number of regions or nomes – Niphaiat in the west, Tiarabia in the east, Nimeshshoti in the north-east and Bashmur (Bashmuric ) in the north. Champollion adds another region in the middle of the Delta which he calls Petmour based on  mentioned by Stephanus of Byzantium, but it is unclear if this is a separate region or just a Greek rendering of the name Bashmur.

After the Muslim conquest, the middle part of the Delta was called al-Rif which means "countryside, rural area" and which is derived from Ancient Egyptian r:Z1-pr*Z1:niwtr-pr, "temple", because the rural areas were administered by them. The eastern part roughly comprising the ancient Tiarabia was called al-Hawf meaning "edge, fringe".

Geography

In ancient times, Pliny the Elder, in Natural History (Book 5, chapter 11), said that upon reaching the delta the Nile split into seven branches (from east to west): the Pelusiac, the Tanitic, the Mendesian, the Phatnitic, the Sebennytic, the Bolbitine, and the Canopic. Today, there are two principal channels that the Nile takes through the river delta: one in the west at Rashid and one in the east at Damietta.

The delta region is well watered, crisscrossed by channels and canals.

Owing primarily to its proximity to the Mediterranean Sea, the climate in Lower Egypt is milder than that of Upper Egypt, the southern portion of the country. Temperatures are less extreme and rainfall is more abundant in Lower Egypt.

History

It was divided into twenty districts called nomes, the first of which was at el-Lisht. Because Lower Egypt was mostly undeveloped scrubland, filled with all types of plant life such as grasses and herbs, the organization of the nomes underwent several changes.

The capital of Lower Egypt was Memphis. Its patron goddess was the goddess Wadjet, depicted as a cobra. Lower Egypt was represented by the Red Crown Deshret, and its symbols were the papyrus and the bee. After unification, the patron deities of both Lower Egypt and Upper Egypt were represented together as the Two Ladies, Wadjet and Nekhbet (depicted as a vulture), to protect all of the ancient Egyptians.

By approximately 3600 BC, Neolithic Egyptian societies along the Nile River had based their culture on the raising of crops and the domestication of animals. Shortly after 3600 BC, Egyptian society began to grow and advance rapidly toward refined civilization. A new and distinctive pottery, which was related to the pottery in the Southern Levant, appeared during this time. Extensive use of copper became common during this time. The Mesopotamian process of sun-dried bricks, and architectural building principles—including the use of the arch and recessed walls for decorative effect—became popular during this time.

Concurrent with these cultural advances, a process of unification of the societies and towns of the upper Nile River, or Upper Egypt, occurred. At the same time, the societies of the Nile Delta, or Lower Egypt also underwent a unification process. Warfare between Upper Egypt and Lower Egypt occurred often. During his reign in Upper Egypt, King Narmer defeated his enemies in the Delta and merged the kingdoms of Upper Egypt and Lower Egypt under his single rule.

List of kings of the Predynastic Period of Lower Egypt

The Palermo stone, a royal annal written in the mid Fifth Dynasty (c. 2490 BC – c. 2350 BC) records a number of kings reigning over Lower Egypt before Narmer. These are completely unattested outside these inscriptions:

In contrast, the following kings are attested through archeological finds from Sinai and Lower Egypt: Double Falcon, Crocodile.

List of nomes

See also

Upper Egypt
Middle Egypt
Upper and Lower Egypt
Nomes of Egypt
Geography of Egypt
Ancient Egypt

References

External links

 
States and territories established in the 4th millennium BC
States and territories disestablished in the 4th millennium BC

Nile Delta
.Lower Middle
Historical regions

it:Geografia dell'antico Egitto#Basso Egitto